Sounds of the 70s is the name of BBC radio programme, currently broadcast on Sundays on BBC Radio 2, with the Sounds of the Seventies name also having been used by BBC Television for a number of themed music compilations, now repeated on BBC Four.

Sounds of the Seventies (Radio 1)
The original Sounds of the Seventies was a Radio 1 programme broadcast on weekdays, initially 18:00–19:00, subsequently 22:00–00:00, on  during the early 1970s. Among the DJs were Mike Harding, Alan Black, Pete Drummond, Annie Nightingale, John Peel (who alone had two shows per week), and Bob Harris (who started presenting the show on 19 August 1970 by playing Neil Young's "Cinnamon Girl"). For contractual reasons one of Peel's two weekly shows was known as Top Gear, but the format and content of the show on every weekday were in essence identical for most of the early 1970s.

Unlike most other Radio 1 programmes, Sounds of the Seventies concentrated on albums rather than singles, and rock music rather than pop. Sessions recorded exclusively by the BBC and featuring major musicians of the day were a regular feature; the Musicians' Union insisted that "needle time" — time given to playing recorded music — should be limited.

In 1974 the Thursday show was replaced by a show without DJs known as the Thursday Night Sequence. Album tracks were played without interruption or introduction, and Pete Drummond gave the artist's name, album name and track name after the piece. It had sound effects such as footsteps or a match lighting up just before the DJ spoke. The program (also known as "The Sequence" was produced by John F Muir, with his name in stereo, sounding John (left channel), F (left and right channel, Muir (right channel)

In early 1975 Sounds of the Seventies was dropped. In September of that year the loss of a nightly slot for progressive rock music was restored by the introduction of the nightly John Peel Show, which initially broadcast from 23:00 to 00:00. Peel carried on and expanded the practice of hosting exclusive sessions by major musicians. The Peel Show format lasted until Peel's death in 2004.

Theme tune
The theme tune for the programme was usually a George Martin piece known as "Theme One", played in baroque style on a church organ. It was the version by Van der Graaf Generator. Martin had written the piece some years earlier as a theme tune for Radio 1. Variations included Mike Harding's use of the central guitar solo from "Heartbreaker" by Led Zeppelin, and Alan Black's regular closing theme, which was the piano and voice coda from "Pilgrim's Progress" by Procol Harum.

Steve Harley: Sounds of the 70s
In 2000, another programme with the name Sounds of the 70s, but unrelated to the original, began broadcasting on BBC Radio 2. Hosted by Steve Harley, the thirty-minute programme featured rock and pop tracks from the 1970s. In 2008, following several series, the show was dropped from the Radio 2 schedule for a year. The last programme was aired on 27 March 2008.

Sounds of the 70s with Johnnie Walker
A new series of Sounds of the 70s began on Sunday 5 April 2009 with DJ Johnnie Walker, broadcasting on Radio 2 as part of the station's retro music output, which also includes Sounds of the 60s (formerly hosted by Brian Matthew, now hosted by Tony Blackburn). Sounds of the 70s with Johnnie Walker runs from 15:00-17:00, and has regular features such as Johnnie's Jukebox which adds an "essential" seven inch single each week to the list, and as of 2023, featured more than 450 tracks in its archive.

On 11 April 2021, Sounds of the 70s was cancelled due to Prince Philip's death. On 10 January 2022, Bob Harris announced he was returning to the programme after more than fifty years away by sitting in for Walker on the episodes to be broadcast on 16 and 23 January.

Other similar series (BBC Radio)
In addition to Sounds of the 70s and Sounds of the 60s, Radio 2 have a five-hour block of retro themed programming each Friday night with two Sounds of.. programmes (each two hours long) scheduled back-to-back. Sounds of the 80s  formerly hosted by Sara Cox, now hosted by Gary Davies.  was brought forward in the BBC Radio 2 schedules from 22:00  and is now broadcast at 20:00 (after Tony Blackburn's Golden Hour at 19:00), while the 10pm to midnight slot was given over to Sounds of the 90s with Fearne Cotton.

Sounds of the Seventies (BBC Four)
As well as the radio programmes, BBC Television also made two series of shows under the title Sounds of the Seventies, which was broadcast originally by BBC2 in 1993 (with Sounds of the 70s 2 being made in 2012) and repeated by UKTV's Yesterday channel in the 2010s. The programmes are used regularly as schedule filler by BBC Four, with the programmes sometimes cut down to 10-15 minute runtime. Sounds of the Seventies compiled 1970s performances from the BBC's music archives, taken from programmes such as Top of the Pops and The Old Grey Whistle Test, with each programme compiled around a music genre or theme, such as the "Rock 'n' Roll Revisited" episode which featured acts whose sound owed a debt to the sounds of the late 1950s and the "Anarchy on the BBC" edition which featured punk acts.

Series 2: Sounds of the 70s 2 (2012)

Other similar series (BBC Television)
Sounds of the Seventies followed on from Sounds of the Sixties which was first broadcast on BBC2 on 5 October 1991, with an episode called "The First Steps" which featured performances from acts such as The Beatles, Gerry and the Pacemakers and The Rolling Stones, along with puppets Pinky & Perky doing the Twist. Due to the nature of the BBC's 1960s Top of the Pops archive, the series compiled each episode from a wide range of BBC programmes such as cutting-edge pop show The Beat Room and children's programmes like Blue Peter and Crackerjack, with some short clips used to set the scene of the 1960s theme being used that week.

On 12 January 1996, an eight-part series called Sounds of the Eighties was first shown by BBC2, with the first episode featuring Duran Duran, Culture Club, ABC, Bananarama and Kylie Minogue. Both the 1960s and 1980s series have been repeated many times on BBC Four, with the programmes also being used by UKTV's Yesterday channel as part of their Saturday night music programming block. In the late 2010s, Sounds of the 80s with Gary Davies had an hour long video version of the show simulcast by BBC Radio 2 and BBC Television (via the Red Button on Freeview channel 601), with pop stars from the 1990s and early 2000s (like Louise and Dido) picking their favourite 1980s hits.

See also
 Sounds of the Sixties

References

External links
 Sounds of the 70s with Johnnie Walker official web page
 A steam radio site featuring brief clips from the show

British music radio programmes
BBC Radio 2 programmes